Thomas Haydon may refer to:

Thomas Haydon (tennis) in 1906 Wimbledon Championships – Men's Singles
Tom Haydon, director of The Talgai Skull

See also
Thomas Hayden (disambiguation)
Tom Hagen